Mya Mya is a 2020 Burmese horror film starring Thinzar Wint Kyaw, Min Taw Win, Dee Dee, and Win Tha Pyay Tun. The film, produced by Night School Film Production and Sein Htay Film Production, premiered in Myanmar on February 6, 2020. The character Mya Mya was based on the death of a feisty Yangon factory worker and strike-organiser before her death – from further humiliation is that, while haunting the men who raped and murdered her, she does not do so half-naked.

Plot
The rape-revenge tale of Mya Mya was inspired by a viral Facebook video. The video features a young woman employed in a Yangon factory who, the viewer is invited to believe, is being possessed by the ghost of Mya Mya, a raped and murdered factory worker.

Cast
 Thinzar Wint Kyaw as Mya Mya
 Min Taw Win as Thuta Min Myat
 Dee Dee as Ye Lwin
 Khin Htwe Su Hlaing as Hnin Si Aye
 Win Tha Pyay Tun as Khin Zarchi Lwin
 Myo Hlaing Win as Hla Thein, A Thein or Sein Gaw Li
 Lin Nay as Aung Ko Oo, Nga Oo or Aung Gyi
 Ko Sai as Kyaw Oo, Tayoke Gyi

References

External links

2020 films
2020s Burmese-language films
Burmese horror films
Films shot in Myanmar